The Castle is a Grade II listed public house at 34-35 Cowcross Street, Farringdon, London.

A public house of this name has existed on this site since at least the 18th century.

Eliza, the wife of Sir John Soane, was born on the same site in 1760.

It was once frequented by King George IV, who issued the landlord with a pawnbroker's licence and handed over his gold watch to obtain some cash after losing money on a cockfight. There is still a pawnbroker's sign - three brass balls - on the outside of the pub and a smaller one inside.

Construction of the current building by the architect H. Dawson started in 1865 and it was opened on 21 November 1867.

References

Buildings and structures in Clerkenwell
Grade II listed pubs in London
Smithfield, London
Commercial buildings completed in 1867
Pubs in the London Borough of Islington
Grade II listed buildings in the London Borough of Islington